Calicotis is a genus of moths in the family Stathmopodidae, although it is sometimes included in the family Oecophoridae.

Species

Calicotis animula   Meyrick, 1911  (from the Seychelles)
Calicotis attiei  (Guillermet, 2011) (from China, Japan, Réunion, Taiwan)
Calicotis crucifera  Meyrick, 1889  (from New Zealand/Australia)
Calicotis exclamationis Terada, 2016 (from Japan, Taiwan)
Calicotis griseella  Sinev, 1988 (from Russia)
Calicotis luteella  Sinev, 1988 (from Russia)
Calicotis microgalopsis  Lower, 1904  (from Australia)
Calicotis praeusta  Meyrick, 1922  (from Fiji)
Calicotis rhizomorpha  Meyrick, 1927  (from Samoa)
Calicotis rotundinidus  Terada, 2016 (from Japan, Taiwan)
Calicotis sialota  Turner, 1917  (from Australia)
Calicotis triploesta  Turner, 1923 (from Australia)

References

[http://zoolstud.sinica.edu.tw/Journals/61/61-63.pdf Zong-Yu Shen, Takeshi Terada and Yu-Feng Hsu, 2022. The Newly Recorded Fern-spore Feeding Moths in the Genus Calicotis, Meyrick 1889 (Lepidoptera: Stathmopodidae) from Taiwan, with Notes on Life History of Three Species. 
Bippus, 2020. Records of Lepidoptera from the Malagasy region with description of new species (Lepidoptera: Tortricidae, Noctuidae, Alucitidae, Choreutidae, Euteliidae, Gelechiidae, Blastobasidae, Pterophoridae, Tonzidae. - Phelsuma
Markku Savela's ftp.funet.fi

Stathmopodidae
Moth genera